Eupogonius affinis is a species of beetle in the family Cerambycidae. It was described by Stephan von Breuning in 1942. It is known from Guatemala, Honduras, and Mexico.

References

Eupogonius
Beetles described in 1942